De Arte Cabbalistica (Latin for On the Art of Kabbalah) is a 1517 text by the German Renaissance humanist scholar Johann Reuchlin,  which deals with his thoughts on Kabbalah. In it, he puts forward the view that the theosophic philosophy of Kabbalah could be of great use in the defence of Christianity and the reconciliation of science with the mysteries of faith. It builds on his earlier work De Verbo Mirifico.

See also
 Humanist Latin
 Scholasticism

References

Christian Kabbalah
Christian apologetic works
Kabbalah texts
Renaissance literature
Renaissance humanism
1517 books
16th-century Latin books